Siri Carpenter (born 1971) is an American freelance science journalist and editor living in Madison, Wisconsin. The author of multiple articles in Scientific American, Science, APA Monitor, and other publications, she is a co-founder and the editor-in-chief of The Open Notebook. In 2018 Carpenter was elected to a two-year term as president of the National Association of Science Writers.

Early life and education 
Carpenter grew up in La Crescent, Minnesota. She is married, with two daughters, and lives in Madison, Wisconsin. She completed her undergraduate education at the University of Wisconsin-Madison, earning a B.A. in psychology in 1995. She earned an M.S. in 1997, and  Ph.D. in 2000, both in social psychology at Yale University. Her dissertation, Implicit gender attitudes, was directed by Mahzarin R. Banaji.

Career

Early career 
In 1998 Carpenter was a Science and Engineering Mass Media Fellow of the American Association for the Advancement of Science, at the Richmond Times-Dispatch in Richmond, Virginia. The following year she was a science writer intern at Science News in Washington, D.C. After completing her Ph.D., Carpenter was hired as a senior science writer for the APA Monitor on Psychology in Washington, D.C., from 2000 to 2002.

Science journalist, editor 
Carpenter's career as a freelance science journalist began in 2002. From 2012 to 2014, she was a senior editor and then a features editor at Discover Magazine in Waukesha, Wisconsin. Since 2014 Carpenter has also worked as a freelance editor for several publications, including bioGraphic, and Science News for Students.

The Open Notebook

In 2010 Carpenter co-founded The Open Notebook (TON), a science journalism non-profit organization, magazine and publisher, with Jeanne Erdmann, a health science journalist. Carpenter is president and editor-in-chief; Erdmann is vice president, secretary, and editor-at-large. Gary Price of Library Journal said The Open Notebook "provides unique tools and resources to help science journalists at all experience levels hone their craft".

National Association of Science Writers 
Carpenter was vice president of the National Association of Science Writers (NASW), 2016–2018, and was elected to a two-year term as president in 2018. NASW is "...a community of journalists, authors, editors, producers, public information officers, students and people who write and produce material intended to inform the public about science, health, engineering, and technology".

Publications

Books 
In 2007, Carpenter and Karen Huffman wrote the textbook, Visualizing Psychology. A second edition was published 2010, and Wiley published the third edition in 2012.

In 2020, TON published The Craft of Science Writing: Selections from The Open Notebook, edited by Carpenter. Jonathan Wai wrote in Psychology Today, "...a new book edited by distinguished science writer Siri Carpenter seeks to illuminate The Craft of Science Writing by collecting numerous perspectives from science writers themselves about how to improve their own craft of science writing."

Selected articles

Awards and honors 

 2009 Outstanding Article Award for Reporting on a Significant Topic, American Society of Journalists and Authors, for "Buried Prejudice", Scientific American Mind, April/May 2008.
 2009 National Magazine Award Finalist, Prevention (December 2009) "Is Your Parent Over-Medicated?"

See also 
 Environmental journalism
 Medical journalism
 Nature writing
 Non-profit journalism
 Open science

References

External links 
 
 Wisconsin Public Radio: The Science behind Writing about Science (audio, 10:43 minutes)
 AAAS podcast interview with Siri Carpenter on data replication in the field of psychology (MP3, 8:35 minutes)
 Working Scientist podcast: Science communication made simple (MP3, 24:17 minutes)

1971 births
21st-century American journalists
21st-century American non-fiction writers
21st-century American women writers
American science journalists
American psychology writers
American social sciences writers
American women journalists
Journalists from Wisconsin
University of Wisconsin–Madison College of Letters and Science alumni
Writers from Madison, Wisconsin
Yale Graduate School of Arts and Sciences alumni
Living people